Sarajevo is a 1940 Hungarian historical film directed by Ákos Ráthonyi and starring Maria von Tasnady, Ferenc Kiss and József Timár. The film is set against the backdrop of events leading up to the assassination of Archduke Franz Ferdinand of Austria in 1914.

Partial cast
 Maria von Tasnady as Pogány Éva 
 Ferenc Kiss as Sztepán Petrov 
 József Timár as Borisz Boronow 
 Lajos Vértes as Báró Várnay Miklós fõhadnagy 
 Lili Berky as Nagymama 
 Margit Ladomerszky as Alexandra 
 Margit Selmeczy as Katja 
 Mária Keresztessy as Irina 
 Erzsi Orsolya as Cigányasszony 
 Lenke Egyed as Márfa 
 Marcsa Simon as Szakácsné

External links 
 

1940 films
Hungarian historical drama films
Hungarian black-and-white films
1940s historical drama films
1940s Hungarian-language films
Films directed by Ákos Ráthonyi
Films set in 1914
Films set in Sarajevo
Films about the assassination of Archduke Franz Ferdinand of Austria
Cultural depictions of Gavrilo Princip
1940 drama films
Hungarian World War I films